Sue Joanne Duggan (born 31 October 1963 in Christchurch) is a former field hockey player from New Zealand, who finished in eight position with the National Women's Field Hockey Team, nicknamed The Black Sticks, at the 1992 Summer Olympics in Barcelona.

References

External links
 

New Zealand female field hockey players
Olympic field hockey players of New Zealand
Field hockey players at the 1992 Summer Olympics
Field hockey players from Christchurch
1963 births
Living people
20th-century New Zealand women